The  are a professional baseball team in Japan's Pacific League based north of Tokyo in Tokorozawa, Saitama Prefecture. Before 1979, they were based in Fukuoka, Fukuoka Prefecture in Kyushu. The team is owned by a subsidiary of Seibu Railway, which in turn is owned by the Seibu Holdings. The team experienced a recent period of financial difficulty, but the situation brightened when the team received a record ¥6 billion (about $51.11 million) posting fee from the Boston Red Sox for the right to negotiate a contract with Daisuke Matsuzaka. Between 1978 and 2008, the team logo and mascot were based on the adult version of Kimba the White Lion, a classic Japanese anime and manga series by Osamu Tezuka. In 2004, former Seibu Lions player Kazuo Matsui became the first Japanese infielder to play in Major League Baseball.

Franchise history

Nishitetsu Clippers (1950)
In 1950, the team became a founding member of the Pacific League. It was then owned by Nishi-Nippon Railroad, which was based in Fukuoka.The Clippers name was chosen as Nishitetsu was in charge of Pan American Airlines' Japanese operations (back then, Pan Am's jets were known as "Clippers" due to them being aeronautical). The team finished sixth that year, and at the end of the season was merged with the Nishi-Nippon Pirates to form the Nishitetsu Lions. Thus the Lions name was adopted and has been retained up to today as the name of the franchise.

Nishitetsu Lions (1951–1972)
The Nishitetsu Lions called Heiwadai Stadium home for their entire existence. They were one of a dominant team in the Pacific League during the 1950s, winning four pennants, including three straight Japan Series against the Yomiuri Giants behind famed manager Osamu Mihara; their last championship in Fukuoka came in 1958.

The team struggled through the following decade and did not witness much success on the field. In 1969–1970 the team was caught up in the infamous Black Mist game-fixing scandal, which resulted in four Lions pitchers being banned from NPB for life, as well as other players receiving lesser punishments. These losses decimated the team, which finished the 1970 season in last place.

After a third straight last-place finish, in November 1972 the franchise was sold to the Fukuoka Baseball Corporation, also a part of Nishi-Nippon Railroad. Following the sale, the team was renamed the Taiheiyo Club Lions.

Taiheiyo Club Lions (1973–1976)
Nishi-Nippon Railroad, founded by Nagayoshi Nakamura, then owner of Lotte Corporation and the Orions, sold the team's sponsorship rights to Taiheiyo Club, a golf course and resort developer in 1973. The Lions, still smarting from the after-effects of the Black Mist Scandal, finished no higher than third throughout the 1970s.

Crown Lighter Lions (1977–1978)
At the end of the 1976 season, the Fukuoka Baseball Corporation announced that the team's new sponsor was Crown Gas Lighter. With this, the team's name for the upcoming season was changed to the Crown Lighter Lions. On October 25, 1978, the team was sold to Kokudo Keikaku (later Kokudo), and then merged into Prince Hotels.

Seibu Lions (1979–2007)
Following the sale of the Crown Lighter Lions and their merging into Prince Hotels, the team was renamed the Seibu Lions and relocated to a new ballpark in Tokorozawa, Saitama. Fukuoka would be left without an NPB team until , when the erstwhile Nankai Hawks were bought by Daiei and moved to the Lions' previous stadium, Heiwadai Stadium.

Golden Age (1982–1994)
However, the following seasons would mark the beginning of a period of sustained success for the team under new manager Tatsuro Hirooka and with star players such as Osamu Higashio and Kōichi Tabuchi. Tatsuro Hirooka told the players that meat and other animal foods increase athletes' susceptibility to injury, and decrease their ability to perform. He required all players to take up a strictly vegetarian diet.

Following the 1986 season, the club replaced Hirooka with Masaaki Mori, who was able to sustain the team's prolonged success. Mori won eight league championships, between 1986 and 1988 and 1990–1994, and six Japan Series championships in his nine-year managing career, winning the Japan Series in 1986, 1987, 1988, 1990, 1991, and 1992.

The team gained the moniker "Invincible Seibu" during the 1980s and 1990s due to their sustained domination of the league. The Lions had a powerful lineup in this period, loaded with sluggers such as Koji Akiyama, Kazuhiro Kiyohara and Orestes Destrade. Their defense also benefited from the services of skilled players such as Hiromichi Ishige, Romeo Calhoun, Hatsuhiko Tsuji and catcher Tsutomu Ito. Among the pitchers employed by the Lions in this period was "The Oriental Express" Taigen Kaku, Kimiyasu Kudoh, Hisanobu Watanabe, and relievers Yoshitaka Katori and Tetsuya Shiozaki.

Prominent Golden Age Players

Saitama Seibu Lions (2008–)
In order to reinforce the affiliation between the team and their home region, the Lions added the prefecture name "Saitama" to their team name in 2008. They were Pacific League Champions that year and went on to win the Japan Series. The team logo and uniforms were further modified for the 2009 season, with the team trading in their traditional light-blue colour scheme for a dark blue design similar to that employed during the Nishitetsu Lions era in the 1950s and 1960s. Between 2010 and 2019, the Lions made the Pacific League Climax Series 1st stage 5 times, (2010, 2011, 2012, 2013, 2017) but lost to the Chiba Lotte Marines in 2010 and 2013, the Tohoku Rakuten Golden Eagles in 2017, and to the Fukuoka SoftBank Hawks in 2011 and 2012. They made the Final Stage twice in back to back years in 2018 and 2019, but lost to the Hawks on both occasions. In 2020, the team finished in 3rd place, but was unable to make the playoffs. Due to the COVID-19 pandemic, the Pacific League removed the First Stage of the playoffs; only the top 2 teams in Pacific League made the playoffs, while Central League removed it entirely, instead opting to send the regular season champion (Yomiuri Giants) straight to the Japan Series. In 2021, the Lions finished in 6th and last place for the first time since 1979 with a 55-70-18 record.

Season-by-season records

Current roster

Managers

 Statistics current through the end of the  season.

Former players of note
 1952–1959 
 1952–1969 
 1953 
 1953–1962
 1954–1968
 1956–1969 
 1969–1988
 1972–1978 
 1973–1978
 Mateo Alou 1974–1976 
 1976–1981
 1977–1991
 1981–1983
 1979–1984
 1980–1985
 1986–1987
 1987–1990
 1975–1981
 1981–1993 
 1981–1994 
 1982–1994, 2010 
 1984–1995 
1986–1996
 1989–1992, 1995
1992–1999
 1993-1998 
 1994–1998
1995–1996 
 1995–2015
1997–2002
 1985–1997
()1998–2000
 2000
 1999–2001
 1994–2003, 2018
 1990–2004
 1997–2005
 1999–2006, 2021 
 2000–2011
 2002–2006
 2001–2007
 2001–2012
 2006-2011
 2008–2013
 2010–2018 
 2012–2022
 2014–2022

Retired number
Team announced Kazuhisa Inao's No.24 was the first retired number of the Lions on May 1, 2012.

MLB players
Yusei Kikuchi (2019-)

Retired From MLB:
Frank Howard (1974)
Kazuhisa Ishii (2002–2006)
Kazuo Matsui (2004–2010)
Shinji Mori (2006–2007)
Daisuke Matsuzaka (2007–2014)

Minor League Team 
The Lions farm team plays in the Eastern League. The year of the team's founding is unknown. They first played in the Kansai Farm League in 1952 and joined the Eastern League in 1979.

Further reading 
 Whiting, Robert. "The Emperor's Team," You Gotta Have Wa (Vintage Departures, 1989), pp. 220–238.

Notes

References

External links

 Saitama Seibu Lions official web site
 High resolution photos and discussion of the Lions in English

 
Nippon Professional Baseball teams
Baseball teams established in 1950
Jungle Emperor Leo
Sports teams in Saitama Prefecture
Tokorozawa, Saitama
1950 establishments in Japan
Railway sports teams